Geoffrey Archer (born 1944) is a fiction writer from London. He specialises in military adventures and spy thrillers and created the character Sam Packer.

Career
Geoffrey Archer was born and grew up in north London and had an interest in fiction and drama from an early age. He attended Highgate School.

After several false starts in his choice of career, Geoffrey Archer moved into journalism. He started with a local television station in Southampton as a trainee researcher, then moved first to Anglia TV in Norwich and then to Tyne-Tees TV in Newcastle as an on-screen journalist. He started as a reporter with ITN in 1969.  He covered the troubles in Northern Ireland in the 1970s and the civil war in Beirut in 1976, was allowed to travel with a Polaris nuclear submarine, and eventually became Defence Correspondent for ITN.  These experiences prompted him to begin writing stories with military and spy themes.

In 1995 Archer left ITN to concentrate on writing full-time. In 1998 his novel Fire Hawk was short-listed for the Crime Writers' Gold Dagger Award.

Personal life
Geoffrey Archer lives on Kew Green in Kew, London. He and his wife Eva have two children.

Books
 1988 – Sky Dancer
 1989 – Shadow Hunter
 1993 – Eagle Trap
 1995 – Scorpion Trail
 1997 – Java Spider
 1998 – Fire Hawk
 2001 – The Lucifer Network
 2002 – The Burma Legacy
 2004 – Dark Angel

References

External links
 
 Brockes, Emma (23 July 2001). "Archer: the interview". The Guardian .

Living people
English thriller writers
English spy fiction writers
Writers from London
People educated at Highgate School
ITN newsreaders and journalists
1944 births
People from Kew, London